Ashley Leitão (born December 6, 1986) Is a Canadian recording artist. She was the ninth-place finisher on the third season of the reality show Canadian Idol in 2005. Her heritage is Portuguese. As of 2005, she resided in Burnaby, British Columbia.

After Idol, she and two other contestants formed the group Braided, releasing an album in 2006, on which Leitão duetted with figure skating champion Elvis Stojko.

Early life 
Born in Winnipeg, Leitão is the daughter of a Portuguese baker. Her parents ran a bakery in Winnipeg. Leitão moved with her family to Portugal at age five, and her family ran a bakery there for ten months. They returned to Canada and lived in Burnaby, operating a bakery in North Vancouver. Leitão, musical from a young age, began formal singing lessons at age nine. She graduated from Burnaby's Alpha Secondary School in 2004.

Canadian Idol 
Performing on the third season of Canadian Idol in 2005, in the first group of the Top 32, Leitão performed the song "Colors of the Wind", which convinced viewers to vote her into the next stage of the competition. She got the second-highest number of votes that night, after Daryl Brunt.

Songs that Ashley performed during the season included:
 Top 32: "Colours of the Wind" (Vanessa Williams)
 Top 10: "Let It Rain" (Amanda Marshall)
 Top 9:  "Sir Duke" (Stevie Wonder)

On the July 27 episode, it was revealed that Leitão was a member of the "Bottom 3", along with Melissa O'Neil and Josh Palmer.  Judge Jake Gold made the observation that all three of them were from Western Canada, and insinuated that regional voting might have been at play. Leitão had the lowest number of votes, and after giving a tearful goodbye to Canada, she performed a farewell rendition of "Sir Duke".

Post-Idol 
Leitão formed the group Braided with fellow former Season 3 contestants Casey LeBlanc and Amber Fleury. Their first single, entitled "A Little Bit Closer", was released to radio on June 15, 2006. She recorded a duet with Elvis Stojko, a former world champion Canadian figure skater. Braided released the album Casey, Ashley and Amber in August 2006.

References

External links 
Official website

1986 births
Canadian Idol participants
Canadian people of Portuguese descent
Living people
Musicians from Winnipeg